David King (born 8 May 1984) is an English former competitive pair skater who represented Great Britain. With his wife Stacey King (née Kemp), he is an eight-time British national champion.

Personal life 
David King was born on 8 May 1984 in Carlisle, Cumbria. He became engaged to Stacey Kemp in 2010. They married in April 2016.

Career 
Originally a skier, King began skating at age ten. He teamed up with Kemp in 2003. The pair began appearing internationally in the 2004–05 season. After competing on the Junior Grand Prix (JGP) series, they placed 11th at the 2005 World Junior Championships in Kitchener, Ontario, Canada.

The following season, Kemp/King moved up to the senior level. They placed 11th at the 2006 European Championships in Lyon, France, and 17th at the 2006 World Championships in Calgary, Alberta, Canada. They were coached by Dawn Spendlove and Stephen Pickavance in Blackburn.

The pair's Grand Prix debut came in November 2006; they placed ninth at the 2006 Cup of China and then seventh at the 2006 NHK Trophy. They trained in Blackburn under Dawn Spendlove. Following the 2006–07 season, they joined Mariusz Siudek and Dorota Siudek in Toruń, Poland.

In January 2010, Kemp/King placed 13th in the short program, 10th in the free skate, and 11th overall at the European Championships in Tallinn, Estonia. In February, the pair represented the UK at the 2010 Winter Olympics in Vancouver, British Columbia, Canada. They finished 16th after ranking 16th in both segments. Concluding their season, they placed 16th at the 2010 World Championships, held in March in Turin, Italy.

Kemp/King were coached by the Siudeks until the end of the 2010–11 season. After moving to Florida, they were coached by Jeremy Barrett in the 2011–12 season and then joined Lyndon Johnston.

In January 2014, Kemp/King finished 13th at the European Championships in Budapest, having placed 16th in the short and 13th in the free. In February, they competed at the 2014 Winter Olympics in Sochi, Russia. During the team trophy, the pair placed tenth in their segment and the UK team had the same result. During the separate pairs' event, Kemp/King placed 19th in the short program and did not advance to the free skate. Their coaches were Lyndon Johnston, Jim Peterson, and Alison Smith.

Programs
(with Kemp)

Competitive highlights
GP: Grand Prix; JGP: Junior Grand Prix

(with Kemp)

References

External links

 

British male pair skaters
English male pair skaters
1984 births
Living people
Sportspeople from Carlisle, Cumbria
Olympic figure skaters of Great Britain
Figure skaters at the 2010 Winter Olympics
Figure skaters at the 2014 Winter Olympics